Flin Flon is a city on the Manitoba-Saskatchewan border in Canada.

Flin Flon may also refer to:
Flin Flon (electoral district), provincial electoral district in Manitoba
Flin Flon greenstone belt, geology
Flin Flon Bombers, a junior hockey team
Flin Flon School Division
Flin Flon Airport
Flin Flon/Channing Water Aerodrome
 Flin Flon, Teenbeat Records band featuring Mark Robinson formerly of Unrest (band), Nattles of Cold Cold Hearts, and Matt Datesman of True Love Always